The North Tower is the unofficial name for one of the lighthouses on the Dutch island Schiermonnikoog, one of the Frisian Islands, on the edge of the North Sea; the other is the South Tower. It was built by H.G. Jansen & A. van Rhyn, and was activated in 1854. From the tower, weather reports are issued for the coastal waters. In 1998 it was painted red.

See also

 List of lighthouses in the Netherlands

Gallery

References

External links

Lighthouses completed in 1853
Lighthouses in Friesland
Lighthouses of the North Sea
Rijksmonuments in Friesland
Schiermonnikoog